Gayle Moran (born 1943) is an American vocalist, keyboardist, and songwriter.  She is from Spring Arbor, Michigan and graduated from Spring Arbor High School (now Spring Arbor University) in 1961. She was a member of the Mahavishnu Orchestra during the mid-1970s, appearing on Apocalypse (1974) and Visions of the Emerald Beyond (1975).

She later appeared on multiple recordings by her husband Chick Corea (whom she married in 1972): Return to Forever's 1977 album Musicmagic, the Chick Corea solo albums The Leprechaun (1975), My Spanish Heart (1976), The Mad Hatter (1978), Secret Agent (1978) and Touchstone (1982). She participated in the making of "Afterlife" from the soundtrack to the 2007 film War starring Jet Li and Jason Statham.

Other guest appearances include "The Gracious Core", on Mark Isham's album Castalia, and the title track from the 1976 David Sancious & Tone release, Transformation (The Speed of Love).

She recorded one album under her own name, I Loved You Then ... I Love You Now (1979).

She appeared on Chick Corea's Antidote (2019) album, with The Spanish Heart Band and Rubén Blades.

References

Living people
Return to Forever members
Mahavishnu Orchestra members
1943 births